A reactor protection system (RPS) is a set of nuclear safety and security components in a nuclear power plant designed to safely shut down the reactor and prevent the release of radioactive materials.  The system can "trip" automatically (initiating a scram), or it can be tripped by the operators.  Trips occurs when the parameters meet or exceed the limit setpoint. A trip of the RPS results in full insertion (by gravity in pressurized water reactors or high-speed injection in boiling water reactors) of all control rods and shutdown of the reactor.

Pressurized water reactors
Some of the measured parameters for US pressurized water plants would include:

"High power", auctioneered between high nuclear power and high differential temperature (delta T) between the inlet and outlet of the reactor vessel (a measure of the thermal power for a given RCS flowrate).
"High startup rate" (active below 10-4 percent power) at low power levels.
"High pressurizer pressure"
"Low reactor coolant flow"
"Thermal margin / low pressure" (reactor power versus RCS pressure)
"High containment pressure"
"Low steam generator level"
"Low steam generator pressure"
"Loss of load" (main turbine trip)

Each parameter is measured by independent channels such that actuation of any two channels would result in an automatic SCRAM or reactor shutdown. The system also allows manual actuation by the operator.

Boiling water reactors

See also

Nuclear power
Nuclear safety and security
 Generation III reactor (evolutionary improvements of existing designs 1996–present)
 Generation IV reactor (technologies still under development unknown start date, possibly 2030)

References

Nuclear power plant components
Nuclear safety and security